The United States Department of Defense held two Belgian detainees in Guantanamo.
A total of 778 suspects have been held in the Guantanamo Bay detention camps, in Cuba since the camps opened on January 11, 2002
The camp population peaked in 2004 at approximately 660.  Only nineteen new suspects, all "high value detainees" have been transferred there since the United States Supreme Court's ruling in Rasul v. Bush. In January 2008 the camp population stood at approximately 285.

The two Belgians were Mesut Sen and Mosa Zi Zemmori.
Both men have been repatriated.
Both men arrived at Guantanamo on February 15, 2002, and were repatriated on April 25, 2005.

On October 11, 2009, the Belgian government accepted the transfer of a former Guantanamo captive who was not a Belgian citizen.

References